Bombus vandykei, the Van Dyke's bumble bee, is a species of bumble bees in the family Apidae. It is found in North America.

The IUCN conservation status of Bombus vandykei is "LC", least concern, with no immediate threat to the species' survival. The population is stable.

References

 Krombein, Karl V., Paul D. Hurd Jr., David R. Smith, and B. D. Burks (1979). Catalog of Hymenoptera in America North of Mexico, vol. 2: Apocrita (Aculeata), xvi + 1199–2209.
 Williams, P. H. (1998). "An annotated checklist of bumble bees with an analysis of patterns of description (Hymenoptera: Apidae, Bombini)". Bulletin of the Natural History Museum (Entomology), vol. 67, no. 1, 79–152.

Further reading

 Arnett, Ross H. (2000). American Insects: A Handbook of the Insects of America North of Mexico. CRC Press.

External links

 NCBI Taxonomy Browser, Bombus vandykei

Bumblebees
Insects described in 1927